Of All the Things is the second studio album by Jazzanova, released in 2008. It features guest appearances from Phonte, Paul Randolph, Ben Westbeech, Thief, José James, Leon Ware, Dwele, Joe Dukie, Pedro Martins, Azymuth, and Bembé Segue.

Track listing

Charts

References

External links 
 

2008 albums
Jazzanova albums
Verve Records albums